Group Captain Charles Brian Fabris Kingcome  (31 May 1917 – 14 February 1994) was a British flying ace of the Second World War, most notable for serving with No. 92 Squadron in 1940 during the Battle of Britain. He frequently led the squadron on a temporary basis before receiving full command early in 1941.

Kingcome later served in North Africa, Sicily, Italy and over Yugoslavia with the RAF, Royal Canadian Air Force and South African Air Force Supermarine Spitfire and heavy bomber units. His total personal score stood at eight enemy aircraft destroyed, three shared, five probable and 13 damaged. Kingcome was awarded the Distinguished Flying Cross (DFC) in 1940, a Bar to the DFC in 1941, and the Distinguished Service Order in 1942.

Early life
Kingcome was born in Calcutta, India, on 31 May 1917 and educated at Bedford School.

RAF career
Kingcome entered the Royal Air Force College Cranwell, Cranwell in 1936.
At the outbreak of the Second World War, Kingcome was based at Hornchurch Airfield serving with No. 65 Squadron RAF. He took part in the battle of France and the battle of Dunkirk; scoring no victories. He was then posted to No. 92 Squadron, RAF Tangmere in May 1940, where he assumed temporary command over No. 92 Squadron after the loss of their Squadron leader Roger Bushell over the skies of Calais on 23 May 1940.

During his time at No. 92 Squadron, Kingcome became acquainted with Geoffrey Wellum. Wellum, who flew as wingman to Flight Lieutenant Brian Kingcome, 92 Squadron's acting CO (the Squadron lost 2 new COs within days of their arrival and Brian Kingcome led the Squadron temporarily in the absence of a squadron commander) later recorded his experiences in the book First Light.

Kingcome was acting CO of No. 92 Squadron between official COs; during a month-long period in September and October, No. 92 Squadron lost three COs. In early 1941, after Squadron Leader John A. Kent was transferred, Kingcome received full command. During this time he and his pilots achieved the highest success rate of any squadron in the entire Battle of Britain. 

After serving with No. 92 Squadron, Kingcome was briefly posted as flight commander at No 61 Operational Training Unit in late 1941. In February 1942, he returned to operations as CO of No. 72 Squadron RAF. Almost immediately he was ordered to provide escort cover for the ill-fated Fleet Air Arm Swordfish attack on the German capital ship Gneisenau, the cruiser ship Prinz Eugen and the capital ship Scharnhorst as they sailed through the Channel in an attempt to reach Kiel, Germany during operation Channel Dash.

Kingcome then became Wing Leader at Kenley in June 1942, and late in the year posted to the Fighter Leader's School at RAF Charmy Down. In May 1943 he was posted to North Africa to command No. 244 Wing RAF and in September he was promoted to Group Captain at the age of 25. With 244 Wing, Kingcome found himself leading five Spitfire squadrons: No. 92 Squadron RAF, No. 145 Squadron RAF, No. 601 Squadron RAF, No. 417 Squadron RCAF and No. 1 Squadron SAAF during the Italian Campaign.

In October, Kingcome attended the RAF Staff College at Haifa. On completion, Kingcome was appointed Senior Air Staff Officer in No. 205 Group, which comprised all of the RAF heavy bomber squadrons in the theatre. In spite of his staff position, Kingcome flew several missions as a waist-gunner in a B-24 Liberator over northern Yugoslavia. He remained in Italy after the war as CO of No. 324 Wing, again on fighters. In mid 1946 he returned to the UK and the Staff College for two years.

Victories
Kingcome flew Spitfires in combat continually until the end of 1944, his tally finishing at 8 and 3 shared destroyed, plus a score of probables and damaged. One of the prewar Cranwell elite, Kingcome was to become one of the Second World War's great fighter leaders, alongside Douglas Bader, Robert Stanford Tuck and Johnnie Johnson.

In May 1940, Kingcome was posted to No. 92 Squadron as flight commander. On 25 May, Kingcome shared a Do 17 and on 2 June destroyed two He 111s and damaged a third. He shared a Ju 88 of 3./LG 1 with two others on 10 July, and again on the 24th. On 9 September he probably destroyed a Bf 110 and two days later shot down a He 111. On the 14th he damaged another. Kingcome shot down a Bf 109 on the 23rd he shot down Ofw. Gerhard Grzymalla of 8./JG 26. The next day he probably destroyed another Me 109 and one was claimed as damaged in Maidstone area around 08.45. Both claims confirmed by Intelligence Officer were unfortunately groundless. Jagdwaffe did not lost single one. Third claim was for damaged Ju 88. Three days later he shared a Ju 88 again, damaged two others, probably destroyed a Do 17, and damaged one of these also. Around this time Kingcome was awarded a DFC for six victories, and on 11 October got a Bf 109 he claimed another next day, and also damaged one. On the 13th he shot down a BF 109 of JG 3.

On 16 June 1941 Kingcome probably destroyed a Bf 109, and on 24 July shot one down. He received a Bar to his DFC, having brought his score to 10 confirmed kills. He was promoted to lead the Kenley wing, and on 15 April 1942 damaged a Fw 190. He probably destroyed a Bf 109 on 28 May, and during the year was awarded a DSO, having added another victory to his score.

In 1943 Kingcome was posted to North Africa to lead 244 Wing, and lead this for 18 months, becoming a Gp. Capt. after the invasion of Italy. By the end of his stay with the wing, he had brought his total personal tally to 8 destroyed, three shared, five probable and 13 damaged enemy aircraft.

Later life
The Second World War had taken a toll on his health and, after being treated for tuberculosis, Kingcome was invalided from the service in 1954.

In civilian life, Kingcome engaged successfully in a London garage and car hire business with his Battle of Britain comrade Paddy Barthropp (who later became very successful with his Rolls-Royce chauffeur business). In 1969, with his wife Lesley (whom he had married in 1957) he set up 'Kingcome Sofas' an enterprise which involved the employment of Devon boat builders to craft sofas to each customer's measurements.

Published works
Kingcome wrote an autobiography called "A Willingness to Die" about his experiences during the Second World War. His memoirs were written shortly before his death in 1994.

Personal quotations
"I always regarded 92 Squadron as my personal property. I led it through, what was to me, the most exhilarating and treacherous part of the war, the Battle of Britain at Biggin Hill. I gained and lost many good friends, and in front line operations I was with 92 longer than any other squadron"

"Why can’t they just talk about Battle of Britain pilots? Why does it always have to be heroes? I think it devalues the word and denigrates all those others who were called on to face just as great odds."

Television and Film
To mark the 70th anniversary of the Battle of Britain, the BBC commissioned a one-off drama for TV called First Light, based on Geoffrey Wellum's book of the same name, in which Brian Kingcome was portrayed by the actor Ben Aldridge. The film was first shown by the BBC on 14 September 2010. He was also personally seen on screen in an uncredited speaking role of "Fighter Pilot" in the opening and closing scenes of the film "First Of The Few" 1942.  (US title "Spitfire")

See also
Kingcome (disambiguation)

References

Bibliography
 Price, Alfred. Spitfire Mark V Aces 1941–45. Osprey, London. 1997. 
 A Cobra in the Sky. Simon Morris. The history of 92 squadron. 

1917 births
1994 deaths
Royal Air Force officers
Graduates of the Royal Air Force College Cranwell
British World War II flying aces
Military personnel of British India
Royal Air Force personnel of World War II
Military personnel from Kolkata
People educated at Bedford School
Companions of the Distinguished Service Order
Recipients of the Distinguished Flying Cross (United Kingdom)
British people in colonial India